Konarzewo may refer to the following places:
Konarzewo, Poznań County in Greater Poland Voivodeship (west-central Poland)
Konarzewo, Rawicz County in Greater Poland Voivodeship (west-central Poland)
Konarzewo, Goleniów County in West Pomeranian Voivodeship (north-west Poland)
Konarzewo, Gryfice County in West Pomeranian Voivodeship (north-west Poland)

See also
 Konarzew (disambiguation)